KBNR is a Spanish language Christian radio station licensed to Brownsville, Texas, broadcasting on 88.3 MHz FM. KBNR serves the Brownsville, Texas - Matamoros, Tamaulipas area, and is owned by World Radio Network, Inc.

References

External links
KBNR's website

BNR
BNR